Halyx (pronounced HAY-licks) was a short-lived science fiction themed rock band developed by Disneyland Records that performed at Tomorrowland in Disneyland in 1981 at the Space Stage. They played only for one summer before the event was closed on September 11, 1981.

History 
In the early 1980s, a team at Disneyland Records, which included executive Gary Krisel, Jymn Magon and Mike Post, wanted to experiment with creating a rock band. After the success of Star Wars (1977) and its second installment The Empire Strikes Back (1980), the team devised a concept of an intergalactic rock band that was a cross between Van Halen or Kiss and Star Wars. They decided that Tomorrowland would be an appropriate venue for their debut as the venue would also be a testing ground for potential music releases.

The names Strike and Starfire were suggested, with Starfire making it into concept art for the band, but it was decided to go with Halyx instead, a play on the word helix, to the dismay of some of the members and the producers. The team eventually settled on the name Halyx, and got band members who would make the band a mixture of human and costumed non-human performers. In auditions, singer Lora Mumford was chosen to be the lead singer while her husband, Thom Miller, would be a robotic keyboardist. Bassist Roger Freeland was put inside a Wookie-like costume which he called the Baharnoth while Tony Coppola was made a percussionist in an amphibian costume. Drummer Brian Lucas, guitarist Bruce Gowdy, and backing singers Jeanette Clinger and Karen Tobin were hired as well.

The band only performed for one season in 1981, with Disneyland management stopping the project and no music being officially released as a deal between Disneyland Records and Warner Music Group had collapsed.

Members 
 Lora Mumford - Lead vocals
 Roger Freeland - Bassist
 Thom Miller - Keyboardist
 Tony Coppola - Percussionist and acrobatics
 Bruce Gowdy - Guitarist
 Brian Lucas - Drummer
 Jeanette Clinger - Backing vocals
 Karen Tobin - Backing vocals

Legacy 
In 2008, audio recordings of Halyx songs from the live concerts found their way onto YouTube.

On August 20, 2020, YouTube web series Defunctland released the film Live from the Space Stage: A Halyx Story, which was a documentary about the band. The film was produced and edited by Kevin Perjurer and directed by Matthew Serrano. On November 14, 2020, YouTube channel Themed Alternative, ran by Perjurer, uploaded a tribute music video named "HAIL HALYX," with the channel also premiering a video titled "HALYX: Reunited" where members and crew of the attraction met over a video call.

References 

American rock music groups
Musical groups established in 1981
Musical groups disestablished in 1981
Disneyland
Science fiction music
Outer space in amusement parks
Tomorrowland